Vito Colonna (born Italy) is a retired Italian-American soccer player and coach.  He played at least ten seasons in the American Soccer League and coached for at least one.

Colonna attended Cleveland State University, playing on the soccer team from 1968 to 1971.  By the end of his four seasons with the Vikings, he had marked himself indelibly in the Cleveland State record books.  He holds over a dozen records including the school's career scoring record of 65 goals.  He holds the seasons scoring record with 22 goals and is third on the all-time assists list with 33.  His junior season, Colonna was selected as an Honorable Mention (third team) All American.  He was inducted into the Cleveland State Athletic Hall of Fame on February 6, 1983.
In 1972, Colonna signed with the Cleveland Stars, an expansion team in the American Soccer League.  In 1974, the team came under new ownership which renamed it the Cobras.  Colonna remained with the team until 1978.  In 1981, he returned for one season as a player coach.  At the end of the season, the Cobras folded.  During the mid-1970s, Colonna was a consistent goal scoring threat.  In 1975, he led the team in scoring with fifteen goals, placing him third on the league's goals list.  In 1976, he scored nine and in 1977, added ten more, tying for sixth place in the league.

References

Living people
American soccer coaches
American soccer players
Italian emigrants to the United States
Cleveland State Vikings men's soccer players
American Soccer League (1933–1983) players
Cleveland Cobras players
American Soccer League (1933–1983) coaches
Association footballers not categorized by position
Year of birth missing (living people)
Sportspeople from Cleveland
Soccer players from Cleveland
Player-coaches